Jolanta Królikowska (born 21 May 1960) is a Polish fencer. She competed in the women's individual and team foil events at the 1980 and 1988 Summer Olympics.

References

External links
 

1960 births
Living people
Polish female foil fencers
Olympic fencers of Poland
Fencers at the 1980 Summer Olympics
Fencers at the 1988 Summer Olympics
Fencers from Warsaw
20th-century Polish women
21st-century Polish women